Andrée Ferretti (1935-September 29, 2022) was a Canadian political figure and author. She was the vice president of the Rassemblement pour l'indépendance nationale (RIN), a Quebec independence movement and later political party of the 1960s. Ferretti was one of the early militants of the contemporary Quebec independence movement.

Biography 
Ferretti was born in Montreal in a family of humble wealth. She began her commitment for Quebec independence in 1958.  She was a member of the Mouvement de Libération Populaire, and when it disbanded joined the Rassemblement pour l'indépendance nationale and became its vice-president. The RIN had distinct left and right wing sections and Ferretti part of the left wing of the party, arguing that the whole socio-economic system needed to be reformed. Ferretti argued that Quebec was "in a mortal struggle against all who contribute to our exploitation, whether they be American Imperialists, Canadian capitalists or the French-Canadian bourgeoisie."  After a confrontation with then-president of the RIN Pierre Bourgault, she resigned from the party  and founded the short-lived Front de libération populaire (FLP) in March 1968. Bourgault asked his followers to join René Lévesque's then-fledgling Parti Québécois using entryism, thus uniting the indépendantiste forces.

During the 1970s, she published a number of writings in favour of independence within Le Devoir and Parti pris, while studying philosophy. In 1979, the Saint-Jean-Baptiste Society made her Patriot of the Year. She directed, with Gaston Miron, a compilation of writings for independence, from the Patriotes to modern Sovereigntism, ending in 1992. After Miron's passing, she directed the second volume regarding the time between 1992 and 2003. She also published three novels at the VLB éditeur and Typo publishing houses.

She died in Montreal, 29 September 2022.

Bibliography 
Renaissance en Paganie (1987)
La Vie partisane (1990)
L'été de la compassion (2003)
Les grands textes indépendantistes: 1774 à 1992
Les grands textes indépendantistes: 1992 à 2003

See also 
Quebec sovereignty movement
Quebec nationalism
Politics of Quebec
Ferretti

References

1935 births
2022 deaths
French Quebecers
Political consultants from Quebec
Writers from Montreal
Canadian non-fiction writers in French
Canadian women non-fiction writers
Women in Quebec politics
20th-century Canadian non-fiction writers
20th-century Canadian women writers
21st-century Canadian non-fiction writers
21st-century Canadian women writers